Sunny Kim may refer to:

 Sun-woo Kim (born 1977), nicknamed Sunny, South Korean baseball pitcher
 Sunny Kim (singer) (born 1979), South Korean composer and singer